Moratalla Club de Fútbol was a Spanish football team based in Moratalla, in the Region of Murcia. Founded in 1979 and dissolved in 2011, it held home matches at Estadio Casa Felipe, with a capacity of 3,000 seats.

History
Moratalla Club de Fútbol was founded in 1979. It first appeared in national category ten years later, competing in Group XIII in the fourth division.

In 2008–09, the club made its first presence in the third level promotion playoffs, being ousted by CD Alcalá 0–2 on aggregate. However, after Lorca Deportiva CF was relegated for lack of payment to its players, Moratalla took its place, making its first appearance in the category on 30 August 2009, in a 0–2 away loss against Real Murcia Imperial, and eventually being relegated back.

The team was dissolved after the 2010–11 season due to economic problems, and its place was bought by a recently founded club, FC Jumilla.

Season to season

1 season in Segunda División B
6 seasons in Tercera División

Famous players
  Fernando Obama
 Tha'er Bawab
 Miroslav Radulovič

External links
Official website 
Futbolme team profile 

Association football clubs established in 1979
Association football clubs disestablished in 2011
Defunct football clubs in the Region of Murcia
1979 establishments in Spain
2011 disestablishments in Spain